Royal Lochnagar distillery is a single malt Scotch whisky distillery based on the Abergeldie Estate, near Balmoral Castle in Royal Deeside. It is close to the mountain Lochnagar. The distillery is in the Highland whisky-producing area of Scotland. The distillery holds a Royal Warrant.

History
The first Lochnagar distillery was built by James Robertson of Crathie in the early 19th century. However, it burnt down in suspicious circumstances in 1824.  A second and third replacement distillery was built and respectively burnt down again in 1826 and then 1841, supposedly by illicit competitors. In 1845, John Begg founded and built the "new" Lochnagar distillery which is the basis of the distillery in operation today.

The distillery was awarded its Royal Warrant in 1848 when John Begg invited Prince Albert to visit the distillery from the nearby Balmoral Castle, the Queen's residence in the Highlands. The next day the distillery was visited by Queen Victoria, Prince Albert and their three eldest children. The distillery was then renamed as Royal Lochnagar three years following Queen Victoria's visit. The distillery sold whisky under the name John Begg until the late 20th century (under the slogan 'Take a peg of John Begg'. The distillery remained in direct family ownership until 1902 when it became a private limited company. In 1916, the company was acquired by DCL. Until 1963, waterwheels and a steam engine powered the site. 

Today Royal Lochnagar is leased by Diageo from the Abergeldie Estate and is the smallest whisky distillery in Diageo's holdings. The present site is largely incorporated in its original farm and steadings, composed of Aberdeenshire granite stone.

Products
The distillery produces a relatively small amount of whisky, most of which is used in Johnnie Walker black and blue label. As well as in use for blends by Diageo, the distillery produces a standard 12 year old single malt for public sale that is bottled at 40% abv.

In June 2022, the distillery released a special edition whisky, known as the 'Balmoral platinum edition' for the Platinum Jubilee of Elizabeth II.

Managers
Mike Nicolson (1998-2003)
David Hardy (2003-06)
Donald Renwick (2006-2011)
Andrew Millsopp (2011-?)
Sean Phillips

References

Bibliography

Distilleries in Scotland
Scottish malt whisky
Scottish brands
Diageo brands